Ha Seung Lee (born January 9, 1995) is a South Korean actress.

Career
In 1999, at the age of 5, Ha Seung Lee made her debut as Kang Hye-rim, the daughter of Shim Eun-ha and Lee Jong-won, in the SBS drama Youth Trap, which recorded the highest viewership rating of 53.1% at the time. Thanks to this popularity, she became a 'child star', including regular appearances in children's programs such as Kiss and Ding Dong Dang Kindergarten, along with many work activities.

Ha Seung Lee then started taking her steps as an adult actress with the role of Hwang Young-geon in the KBS2 Monday-Tuesday drama School 2017, and her first appearance after 19 years of her debut in the KBS1 evening daily drama Sunny Again Tomorrow in 2018.

After that, in 2019, Ha Seung Lee starred in the tvN series Search: WWW, and three years later in 2022, Ha Seung Lee appeared in the role of a prodigious archer named Jang Ha-ri in the Netflix original series All of Us Are Dead. She gained a lot of attention for the role of Ha-ri after the web series aired. She gained a new nickname 양궁선배, which means "archer senior" or "known as archer's sister".

Filmography

Television series

Films

Variety shows

Advertise/CF

Musical/MV

Ambassadorship 

 PR ambassadors of the Office of Cultural and Sports Promotion (2022)

Awards and nominations

References

External links 
Ha Seung-ri at Banana Culture

1995 births
Living people
South Korean television actresses
South Korean film actresses
South Korean child actresses
People from Seongnam